Kolonia Janowska  is a settlement in the administrative district of Gmina Pyzdry, within Września County, Greater Poland Voivodeship, in west-central Poland.

References

Kolonia Janowska